The Hunter River, New Zealand is a river of New Zealand, flowing into Lake Hāwea.

See also
List of rivers of New Zealand

References

Rivers of Otago
Rivers of New Zealand